Jerome Morfaw (born February 20, 1984) is an Australian American Cameroonian judoka, who competes in the -100 kg category, as a member of the Cameroon national team.

References

Living people
1984 births